Elmo Johannes Hannunpoika Lakka (born 10 April 1993 in Elimäki) is a Finnish athlete specialising in the high hurdles. He represented his country at two outdoor and one indoor European Championships without qualifying for the final.

His personal bests are 13.59 seconds in the 110 metres hurdles (+1.2 m/s, Kuortane 2019) and 7.67 seconds in the 60 metres hurdles (Kuopio 2019).

On 2 June 2021, he ran 13.31	(-0.3) at Harjun stadion, in Jyväskylä, beating the National record.

International competitions

References

External links
Official page

1993 births
Living people
Finnish male hurdlers
People from Elimäki
Finnish Athletics Championships winners
World Athletics Championships athletes for Finland
Athletes (track and field) at the 2020 Summer Olympics
Olympic athletes of Finland
Sportspeople from Kymenlaakso